Only a Servant (German:Nur ein Diener) is a 1919 German silent film directed by Erik Lund.

The film's art direction was by Siegfried Wroblewsky.

Cast
In alphabetical order
 Ernst Behmer
 Ria Jende 
 Bruno Kastner 
 Karl Platen 
 Leopold von Ledebur 
 Lotte Werkmeister

References

Bibliography
 Hans-Michael Bock and Tim Bergfelder. The Concise Cinegraph: An Encyclopedia of German Cinema. Berghahn Books.

External links

1919 films
Films of the Weimar Republic
German silent feature films
Films directed by Erik Lund
German black-and-white films
1910s German films